Lake is an unincorporated community in Baltimore County, Maryland, United States. It is located at latitude 39°23'29" North, longitude 76°38'28" West.

Unincorporated communities in Maryland
Unincorporated communities in Baltimore County, Maryland